Expulsion or expelled may refer to:

General 
 Deportation
 Ejection (sports)
 Eviction
 Exile
 Expeller pressing
 Expulsion (education)
 Expulsion from the United States Congress
 Extradition
 Forced migration
 Ostracism
 Persona non grata

Media 
 Expelled (film), 2014 teen comedy film
 Expelled: No Intelligence Allowed, 2008 film
 Expulsion (band), Swedish doom/death metal band
 The Expelled, English punk/rock band
 The Expulsion (film), a 1923 silent German film
 "Expelled" (short story), a 1930 short story by John Cheever

See also

 
 
 Ejaculation (disambiguation)
 Ejection (disambiguation)
 Evicted (disambiguation)
 Explosion (disambiguation)